Margaret Jean "Peg" Taylor (19 February 1917 – 22 July 2004) was a New Zealand cricketer who played primarily as a right-arm medium bowler. She appeared in one Test match for New Zealand, their first, in 1935. She played domestic cricket for Canterbury.

References

External links
 
 

1917 births
2004 deaths
Cricketers from Christchurch
New Zealand women cricketers
New Zealand women Test cricketers
Canterbury Magicians cricketers